This is an incomplete list of Hong Kong television series and programmes.

Current shows

Children's 
After School ICU (TVB Jade, in Cantonese)

Current affairs 
City Forum (RTHK, in Cantonese)
Headliner (RTHK, in Cantonese)
The Pearl Report (TVB, in English)
Police Report (RTHK. in Cantonese and English)
The Pulse (RTHK. in English)

Game shows
Super Trio Series (TVB, in Cantonese)

Lifestyle 
Dolce Vita (TVB, in English)

Music 
Jade Solid Gold (TVB, in Cantonese)

News 
News at 6:30 (TVB Jade, in Cantonese)

Talk and variety 
Miss Hong Kong Pageant (TVB, in Cantonese, broadcast annually)

Past shows

See also
List of programmes broadcast by Television Broadcasts Limited

 
Television series